Macularia is a genus of air-breathing land snails, a pulmonate gastropod in the subfamily Helicinae of the family Helicidae, the typical snails.

Species
 Macularia niciensis (A. Férussac, 1821)
 Macularia saintivesi (Kobelt, 1906)
 Macularia sylvatica (Draparnaud, 1801)
Species brought into synonymy
 Macularia riffensis Kobelt, 1903: synonym of Hatumia riffensis (Kobelt, 1903) (original combination)
 Macularia saintyvesi (Kobelt, 1906): synonym of Macularia saintivesi (Kobelt, 1906)
 Macularia vittata (O. F. Müller, 1774): synonym of Pseudotrachia vittata (O. F. Müller, 1774) (superseded combination)

References

 Ferussac A.E.J.P.F. d'Audebard de, 1821 Deuxième partie: Tableau particuliers des mollusques terrestres et fluviatiles, tableau de la famille des Limaçons et tableau de la famille des Auricules. In: Tableaux systématiques des animaux mollusques suivis d'un prodrome général pour tous les mollusques terrestres ou fluviatiles, vivants ou fossiles, p. 111 pp [quarto ed]
 Pfeffer, G. (1930). Zur Kenntnis tertiärer Landschnecken. Geologisch-Paläontologische Abhandlungen, neue Folge. 17(3): 153–380.
 Bank, R. A. (2017). Classification of the Recent terrestrial Gastropoda of the World. Last update: July 16, 2017

External links

 Albers, J. C. (1850). Die Heliceen nach natürlicher Verwandtschaft systematisch geordnet. Berlin: Enslin. 262 pp

Helicidae
Gastropod genera